Virbia is a genus of tiger moths in the family Erebidae. The genus was erected by Francis Walker in 1854.

Species

References

 Lafontaine, J. D. & Schmidt, B. C. (2010). "Annotated check list of the Noctuoidea (Insecta, Lepidoptera) of North America north of Mexico". ZooKeys. 40: 1–239. 
 Zaspel, J. M. & Weller, S. J. (2006). Review of generic limits of the tiger moth genera Virbia Walker and Holomelina Herrich-Schäffer (Lepidoptera: Arctiidae: Arctiinae) and their biogeography. Zootaxa. 1159: 1-68.
 Zaspel, J. M.; Weller, S. J. & Cardé, R. T. (2008). "A faunal review of Virbia (formerly Holomelina) for North America North of Mexico (Arctiidae: Arctiinae: Arctiini)". Bulletin of the Florida Museum of Natural History. 48 (3): 59-118.

 
Arctiina
Moth genera